Lovatnet (also Loenvatnet) is a lake in the municipality of Stryn in Vestland county, Norway. The water from the lake flows down from the mountains; especially from the Jostedalsbreen and Tindefjellbreen glaciers. It then flows out through the Loelva river into the Nordfjorden.

Water from the tiered horsetail waterfall Ramnefjellsfossen with a total height of 818m flows into the lake from a short distance away, by some criteria among the highest dozen waterfalls in the world. It is fed by meltwater from the glacier Ramnefjellbreen, an arm of the Jostedalsbreen glacier.

Landslides into the southern end of the lake from the mountain Ramnefjellet caused two major tsunamis in 1905 and 1936. At the northern end of the lake, a wave measured at almost  in height destroyed a bridge.

Geologists studied the 1905 event and concluded that little risk existed for future disasters like it, so the towns along the lake were rebuilt. A  wave struck the northern end of the lake and caused damaging flooding in the Loelva River, the lake's northern outlet. The waves killed 74 people and severely injured 11. The 1936 disaster resulted in the depopulation of the area.

See also
List of lakes in Norway

References

Lakes of Vestland
Stryn
Landslides in 1905
Landslides in Norway